Best of John Sykes is a compilation album by John Sykes, released in 2000. It features a slightly different track listing to Sykes' previous compilation album Chapter One.

Track listing
All songs written and composed by John Sykes, except where noted.

References

John Sykes albums
Albums produced by John Sykes
2000 greatest hits albums